Allendorf (official name: Allendorf (Lumda)) is a small town in the district of Giessen, in Hesse, Germany.

References

Giessen (district)